Idy was an important Ancient Egyptian official in the Eighth Dynasty known from several sources. He lived at the beginning of the First Intermediate Period and was the son of Shemay, who is also known from several monuments and decrees from Koptos. His mother was the king's daughter Nebet. Idy appears on many royal decrees found at Koptos. There he bears the important title of a vizier, but was also overseer of Upper Egypt and overseer of priest and count. The decrees are dated under king Neferkauhor and Neferirkare. One decree (called today Koptos M) is addressed to Shemay and dates under Neferkauhor. It reports the appointment of Idy to the overseer of Upper Egypt. A second one (Koptos Q) mentions affairs in the temple of Min at Koptos. In a third decree (Koptos R) Idy bears the titles of a vizier. In the decree, the king protects the statues and the funerary cult of Idy. The decree is dated under king Neferirkare, who was the successor of Neferkauhor. It seems that Idy took over many positions that his father hold before.

Idy is also known from inscriptions in the tomb of his father Shemay. One inscription reports that Idy found the chapel of his father in ruins and rebuilt it. A second inscription reports that king Pepy Neferirkare (the latter name is partly destroyed), was sending someone to bring for him a sarcophagus and stones for the father's tomb. The name of Idy is not preserved, but can be reconstructed. The shipping of the sarcophagus is also depicted on one wall in Shemay's tomb. Here is also mentioned the local official and eldest king's son User.

There is also a statue in Brussels (no. E.4355) that might belong to Idy. Here he bears the titles god's father, beloved of the god and hereditary prince (iry-pat). There is also a rock inscription from the Wadi Hammamat that most likely belongs to this Idy. Here he bears the titles royal sealer, sole friend, controller of priests, privy to the secret of the god's treasure. The inscription also mentions the overseer of Upper Egypt Tjauti-iqer and reports the bringing of stones.

References

Bibliography

External links
Koptos Decree Q at the Metropolitan Museum of Art

Viziers of the Eighth Dynasty of Egypt
Nomarchs
Ancient Egyptian priests
Overseers of Upper Egypt